Semyon Ivanovich Shurtakov (26 January 1918 — 13 April 2014) was a Soviet Russian writer.  

He fought in the Great Patriotic War, serving in the Pacific Fleet. In 1951 he graduated with honors from the Gorky Institute. In 1957 he joined the Union of Writers of the USSR. He wrote more than 30 books of prose and essays, and he was also a talented translator who worked mainly from other languages within the Soviet Union.

He was known for his contributions to children's literature; his work was translated into Bengali by Noni Bhoumik for inclusion in an anthology of children's stories called "Brishti ar Nokkhotro" (The Rain and the Stars).

References

20th-century Russian writers
21st-century Russian writers
Soviet writers
1918 births
2014 deaths
People from Sergachsky Uyezd
Recipients of the Order of the Red Banner of Labour
Communist Party of the Soviet Union members
Socialist realism writers
Soviet military personnel of World War II
Maxim Gorky Literature Institute alumni